Nikolai Nikolayevich Zimin (1895 – September 10, 1938) was a Soviet politician. He was a recipient of the Order of Lenin. He was a member of the Central Committee elected by the 17th Congress of the All-Union Communist Party (Bolsheviks). He was appointed head of the Transportation Department on July 9, 1935. During the Great Purge, he was arrested on February 11, 1938, sentenced to death on September 7, 1938 by the Military Collegium of the Supreme Court of the Soviet Union and executed by firing squad three days later. After the death of Joseph Stalin, he was rehabilitated.

Bibliography 
 Przewodnik po historii Partii Komunistycznej i ZSRR (ros.)
 http://www.az-libr.ru/index.htm?Persons&70B/b6310cc5/0001/8472b0d7 (ros.)

1895 births
1938 deaths
People from Pskov Oblast
People from Porkhovsky Uyezd
Russian Social Democratic Labour Party members
Bolsheviks
First convocation members of the Soviet of the Union
Recipients of the Order of Lenin
Great Purge victims from Russia
People executed by firing squad
Executed politicians
People executed by the Soviet Union
Soviet rehabilitations